= Motoring regulations in Belgium =

Motoring regulations in Belgium are similar to those in surrounding countries. Driving is on the right side of the road; with a few specific exceptions, seat belts are required for all passengers. Cars four years of age and older are required to be checked every year, to make sure they are roadworthy. Number plates are specific to the insurance company and driver; a primary driver with the same insurance company may retain their number plate.

== Number-plate design ==
Belgian automobile plates have a white background with red numbers and letters; motorcycle plates have black numbers and letters on a yellow background. A three-letter combination is usually followed by a three-number combination (for example, "AAA 111"); however, there are still many older plate numbers in use (one letter—four numbers or two letters—three numbers, in various combinations).

== Speed limits ==
- Highways: 120 km/h (75 mph)
- Regional roads: 70 km/h (50 mph)
- Within city limits: 50 km/h (31 mph)
- Slow zones: 30 km/h (19 mph)

=== Fines ===
Fines usually begin at 11 kilometres per hour (6.8 mph) above speed limit. When caught, the offender can choose to settle and pay the fine or dispute the offence before a court. If the offender is travelling 40 kilometres per hour (25 mph) or more above the speed limit, the offender's driving license will immediately be revoked for at least two weeks. The offender is required to go to court, and cannot settle beforehand (the 40-km/h rule applies to good weather; it is less under bad weather conditions).

== Blood-alcohol limit ==
In Belgium, the threshold blood alcohol content limit for a charge of driving under the influence is 0.05.
